Tramea stenoloba, the narrow-lobed glider, is a species of dragonfly in the Libellulidae family. It is found in the Cocos Islands, Lesser Sunda Islands, Java Sea and Australia.

Description
Tramea stenoloba is a medium to large dragonfly (wingspan 100mm, length 55mm) with its synthorax almost uniformly red, and noticeable dark patches at the base of its hindwings. Its abdomen is red with the last two segments black. The female is a duller brown. It is very similar to Tramea loewii, with differences in coloring of the synthorax, and genital dimensions.

Habitat
Tramea stenoloba inhabits riverine lagoons, lakes and ponds. In Australia it is widespread except for the far south-east of the continent. It is likely to be less common than Tramea loewii, with fewer records listed in the Atlas of Living Australia.

Gallery

References

Libellulidae
Odonata of Australia
Insects of New Guinea
Insects of Indonesia
Taxa named by J.A.L. (Tony) Watson
Insects described in 1962